HOLODECK architects is a Vienna, Austria based architectural studio.  Established in 1998, it is a partnership of Marlies Breuss and Michael Ogertschnig.

HOLODECK has created residences, landscape architecture, flexible reusage projects, and public institutions in Austria, Germany, and Thailand.

Architectural methodology  
HOLODECK architects' design process is concept based and context orientated. The studio’s strategies and processes analyze information to produce new spatial arrangements that reflect on the surroundings and to introduce the most suitable materials and technology.

Projects 
 2016-2022 kulturzentrum mattersburg / zentrum für kultur und forschung, Mattersburg, Austria 
 2013-2017 austrian embassy bangkok, Bangkok, Thailand  
 2017 archiv der avantgarden AdA, Dresden, Germany
 2015 double vision, Albrecht Dürer & William Kentridge, Kulturforum Berlin, Germany 
 2015 WDR crossmedia house, Cologne, Germany
 2009-2015 wirtschaftspark breitensee, Vienna, Austria 
 2009-2014 breitensee studios, Vienna, Austria 
 2009-2012 roof transformations, Vienna, Austria 
 2009-2011 urban topos, Vienna, Austria 
 2011 Aktionsraum 1, MUMOK Museum of contemporary art, Vienna, Austria 
 2005-2008 embedded house, Heiligengeist, Austria 
 2005-2008 stratified townscape, Vienna, Austria 
 2005-2006 spatial appropriation, Vienna, Austria 
 2003-2005 floating house, Siegenfeld, Austria 
 2003-2004 shifthouse, Klagenfurt, Austria
 2003-2004 marzona book collection, Architekturzentrum Wien AzW, Vienna, Austria 
 2002-2008 22 tops, Wolfsberg, Austria
 2002-2003 rooftop 02, Vienna, Austria 
 2001-2002 parkhouse, Vienna, Austria 
 1999-2000 hall 01, St. Veit an der Glan, Austria 
 1996-1999 benthouse, Grosshöflein, Austria

Awards  
 2020 Energy Globe Award, Thailand 
 2020 European Architecture Awards
 2019 Mies van der Rohe Award Nominee
 2019 LEAF - Leading European Architects Forum Award 
 2019 The Plan Award
 2019 Iconic Awards Best of Best Environment Building
 2019 Architecture Masterprize Firm Of The Year Award
 2018 Austrian Green Planet Building Awards
 2014 Best Architects Award
 2010 Landesbaupreis Kärnten Acknowledgement

Teaching  
Since 1996, the studio gives lectures and tutors design studios at universities.
 The human needs, Research and Design Studio, TU Vienna and Kasetsart University Bangkok, 2019

Architecture discourse  
 reflecting human needs, TURN ON Architekturfestival, Vienna, 2021
 The Future of “Global Architecture”, Faculty of Architecture and Spatial Planning, TU Vienna, 2019 
 austrian embassy bangkok, TURN ON Architekturfestival, Vienna, 2018 
 stratified townscape, 22 tops, TURN ON Architekturfestival, Vienna, 2009

Literature  
 Society now! - Architektur. Projekte und Positionen, Published by Michael Seidel und Gerhard Steixner, Building Design and Construction, TU Vienna, 2009-2019. ISBN 978-3-03860-178-4
 Aktionsraum 1, catalogue for the exhibition at the MUMOK, published by Sophie Haaser, Rainer Fuchs, Museum Moderner Kunst Stiftung Ludwig Vienna, 2011. ISBN 978-3-902490-78-0
 Double Vision Albrecht Dürer & William Kentridge, catalogue for the exhibition in Kupferstichkabinett Berlin, 2015. ISBN 978-3-944874-37-1
 The Human Needs, published by Marlies Breuss and Faculty of Architecture, Kasetsart University, Bangkok, 2019. ISBN 978-616-278-534-4

References 

Architecture firms of Austria
Austrian companies established in 1998